The Industrial and Provident Societies Act 1965 (c. 12) was an Act of the Parliament of the United Kingdom that regulated industrial and provident societies in Great Britain and the Channel Islands.

From 1 August 2014 it was repealed and replaced by the consolidating Co-operative and Community Benefit Societies Act 2014.

The Co-operative and Community Benefit Societies and Credit Unions Act 2010 contained a provision that would have renamed the Act the Co-operative and Community Benefit Societies and Credit Unions Act 1965, but this was repealed on 1 August 2014 before coming into force.

History
In the UK, and some Commonwealth countries, many co-operatives are registered as industrial and provident societies. Since 2014 the applicable laws now explicitly name co-operatives and community benefit societies in their titles.

In January 2012 the UK Prime Minister, David Cameron announced a project to consolidate all the legislation applicable to industrial and provident societies. There was some uncertainty as to how far new developments would address the problems with the legislation. In mid-2012, revision of laws for co-operative was in its early stages. The enactment of the Co-operative and Community Benefit Societies Act 2014 completed the reform process.

Jurisdiction  
This legislation applies in Great Britain (England, Wales, and Scotland). Northern Ireland has its own very similar legislation. The 1965 and 1968 Acts also apply to Jersey and Guernsey.

See also
 Co-operative and Community Benefit Societies Act 2014
 Co-operative and Community Benefit Societies Act 2003

References

External links

Related Acts
Industrial and Provident Societies Act 1965 c. 12
Industrial and Provident Societies Act 1967 c. 48
Friendly and Industrial and Provident Societies Act 1968 c. 55	
Industrial and Provident Societies Act 1975 c. 41
Industrial and Provident Societies Act 1978 c. 34
Industrial and Provident Societies Act 2002 c. 20	
Co-operatives and Community Benefit Societies Act 2003 c. 15
Co-operative and Community Benefit Societies and Credit Unions Act 2010

Related secondary legislation
The Industrial and Provident Societies (Group Accounts) Regulations 1969 SI 1969/1037
Community Benefit Societies (Restriction on Use of Assets) Regulations 2006 SI 2006/264
The Friendly and Industrial and Provident Societies Act 1968 (Audit Exemption) (Amendment) Order 2006 SI 2006/265	
The Mutual Societies (Electronic Communications) Order 2011 SI 2011/593
The Legislative Reform (Industrial and Provident Societies and Credit Unions) Order 2011	SI 2011/2687

Co-operatives in the United Kingdom
United Kingdom Acts of Parliament 1965